Sofia Kraft (born 23 December 1965) is a Swedish backstroke and individual medley swimmer. She competed in two events at the 1984 Summer Olympics.

References

External links
 

1965 births
Living people
Swedish female backstroke swimmers
Swedish female medley swimmers
Olympic swimmers of Sweden
Swimmers at the 1984 Summer Olympics
Sportspeople from Västra Götaland County
20th-century Swedish women